Tudenham Park House, originally called Rochfort House, is an 18th-century Palladian limestone country house located in Tudenham Park on the Rochfort Demesne near Belvedere House and Gardens beside Lough Ennell, County Westmeath, Ireland. The house is known for being involved in an ordeal with Robert Rochfort's brother, George, which resulted in Robert constructing The Jealous Wall so he would not have to look at his brother's grander house. During World War II, the house was used as a convalescent home for army officers.

History 
The construction on the house began in 1717, and it was completed in 1742 for George Rochfort. It was purchased by Sir Francis Hopkins in 1836, and the name was subsequently changed from Rochfort to Tudenham Park. Hopkins' tenure lasted 34 years until the property was sold to the affluent Tottenham family in 1870. On 7 March 1906, with the property being owned by the Tottenham family for a number of years at this stage, Charles Gore Loftus Tottenham inherited Tudenham House and land from his grandmother. The Tottenham family had not lived in the property since 1952 and in 1958, the house was gutted by a fire that destroyed the roof but spared the walls, chimneystacks and main façade which still stand to this day. The family decided to sell the house ruin and land in 1963. The house suffers from overgrown vegetation and multiple efforts have been made to conserve the property since 2005.

Selling of the land and house 
In December 2013, the land, including the house, was sold at an auction for €681,000 which was almost €300,000 more than the guide price to a businessman from Westmeath.

References 

Buildings and structures in Mullingar
1742 establishments in Ireland
Richard Cassels buildings